Slovenia competed at the 2015 World Championships in Athletics in Beijing, China, from 22–30 August 2015.

Results
(q – qualified, NM – no mark, SB – season best)

Men
Track and road events

Field events

Women 
Track and road events

Field events

Sources 
Slovenian team

Nations at the 2015 World Championships in Athletics
World Championships in Athletics
Slovenia at the World Championships in Athletics